Alexander Goldie (15 November 1896 – 6 November 1918) was a Scottish professional footballer who played in the Scottish Football League for Kilmarnock.

Personal life
Goldie was recorded as living at Mauchline Road, Riccarton, Ayrshire with his parents and two brothers in the 1901 census. He died of Spanish flu on 6 November 1918 aged 21.

Career statistics

References

1896 births
1918 deaths
Footballers from East Ayrshire
Scottish footballers
Scottish Football League players
Association footballers not categorized by position
Hurlford United F.C. players
Kilmarnock F.C. players
Deaths from the Spanish flu pandemic in Scotland